An empresario was a person who had been granted the right to settle on land in exchange for recruiting and taking responsibility for settling the eastern areas of Coahuila y Tejas in the early nineteenth century. The word in Spanish for entrepreneur is emprendedor (from empresa, "company"). 

Since Empresarios attracted immigrants mostly from the Southern United States, they encouraged the spread of slavery into Texas. Although Mexico banned slavery in 1829, the settlers in Texas revolted in 1835 and continued to develop the economy, dominated by slavery, in the eastern part of the territory.

Background 

In the late 18th century, Spain stopped allocating new lands in much of Spanish Texas, stunting the growth of the province. It changed this policy in 1820, and made it more flexible, allowing colonists of any religion to settle in Texas (formerly settlers were required to be Catholic, the established religion of the Spanish Empire). Moses Austin, an American colonist, was the only man granted an empresarial contract in Texas under Spanish law. But Moses Austin died before he could begin his colony, and Mexico achieved its independence from Spain in September 1821. At this time, about 3500 colonists lived in Texas, mostly congregated at San Antonio and La Bahia.

The Mexican government continued the generous immigration policies in order to develop east Texas.  Even as the government debated a new colonization law, Stephen F. Austin, son of Moses Austin, was given permission to take over his father's colonization contract. Steven F. Austin is probably the best known and most successful empresario in Texas. The first group of colonists, known as the Old Three Hundred, arrived in 1822 and settled along the Brazos River, ranging from the Gulf of Mexico to near present-day Dallas.  

In 1823, Mexico’s authoritarian ruler Agustín de Iturbide enacted a colonization law authorizing the national government to enter into a contract granting land to an “empresario,” or promoter, who was required to recruit a minimum of two hundred families to settle the grant.

Mexico approved immigration on a wider basis in 1824 with passage of the General Colonization Law.  This law authorized all heads of household who were citizens of or immigrants to Mexico as eligible to claim land.  After the law passed, the state government of Coahuila y Tejas was inundated with requests by foreign speculators to establish colonies within the state.  There was no shortage of people willing to come to Texas.  The United States was still struggling with the aftermath of the Panic of 1819, and soaring land prices within the United States made the Mexican land policy seem very generous.

Most successful empresarios recruited colonists primarily in the United States.  Only two of the groups that attempted to recruit in Europe built lasting colonies, Refugio and San Patricio.  These colonies were successful in part because the empresarios spoke Spanish, were Catholic and generally familiar with Mexican ways, and allowed local Mexican families to join their colonies.

In 1829, Mexico abolished slavery, which affected the Anglo-American settlers’ quest for wealth in building colonizations worked by enslaved Africans. They lobbied the Mexican government for a reversal of the ban and gained only a one-year extension to settle their affairs and free their bonded workers - the government refused to legalize slavery.

Rules for settlers 
Unlike its predecessor, the Mexican law required immigrants to practice Catholicism and stressed that foreigners needed to learn Spanish.  Settlers were supposed to own property or have a craft or useful profession, and all people wishing to live in Texas were expected to report to the nearest Mexican authority for permission to settle.  The rules were widely disregarded and many families became squatters.

Under the new laws, people who did not already possess property in Texas could claim 4438 acres of irrigable land, with an additional 4438 available to those who owned cattle.  Empresarios and individuals with large families were exempt from the limit.

Notable empresarios 

After the Republic of Texas won its independence from Mexico, the young nation continued its own version of the empresario program, offering grants to French diplomat Henri Castro and abolitionist Charles Fenton Mercer, among others.

See also
 Patroon (a similar system in New Netherland)

References

Sources

External links 

Maps:
Texas Land Grants and Political Divisions, 1821–1836, from the Atlas of Texas, 1976
T. G. Bradford's Map of Texas, 1835

History of Mexico
Mexican Texas
Spanish Texas
Irish-American history and culture in Texas